In the Gregorian calendar, New Year's Eve, also known as Old Year's Day or Saint Sylvester's Day in many countries, is the evening or the entire day of the last day of the year, 31 December. The last day of the year is commonly referred to as “New Year’s Eve”. In many countries, New Year's Eve is celebrated with dancing, eating, drinking, and watching or lighting fireworks. Some Christians attend a watchnight service. The celebrations generally go on past midnight into New Year's Day, 1 January.

The Line Islands (part of Kiribati), Samoa and Tonga, in the Pacific Ocean, are the first places to welcome the New Year, while American Samoa, Baker Island and Howland Island (part of the United States Minor Outlying Islands) are among the last.

By region

Africa

Algeria
In Algeria, New Year's Eve is usually celebrated with family and friends. In the largest cities, such as Algiers, Constantine, Annaba, Oran, Sétif, and Béjaïa, there are large celebrations which may feature concerts, late-night partying, firecrackers, fireworks at midnight and sparklers and shouts of "Bonne année !". The Martyrs' Memorial and the Grand-Post Place in Algiers are the main attraction for the majority of Algerians during the celebration, while some others prefer spending this special night outside the country, generally in Tunis or Paris.

At , the President's message of greetings to Algerians is read on TV. The EPTV network airs a yearly New Year's Eve entertainment show, variying its name, hosts and guests, which features sketches and musical performances. Popular films are also broadcast. At home or at restaurants, a special type of pastry cake called "la bûche" is eaten, and black coffee or soda is often drunk with it. People eat it a few minutes before the New Year's countdown.

On New Year's Day (le jour de l'an), Algerians, especially children, write their "New Year's letter" on decorated paper, called "Carte de bonne année", to their parents and relatives, featuring their resolutions and wishes.

Egypt
In Egypt the new year is celebrated with fireworks and often evening parties with friends and family.

Ghana
In Ghana, Ghanaians celebrate New Year's Eve by going to church; others go to nightclubs, pubs or take to the streets to celebrate. At midnight, fireworks are displayed across various cities of Ghana, especially in Accra and Tema.

Morocco

In Morocco, New Year's Eve (—"head of the year") is celebrated in the company of family and friends. Moroccans get together to eat cake, dance, and laugh. Traditionally, Moroccans celebrate it at home, but some prefer to go to nightclubs. At midnight, fireworks are displayed across Ain Diab, in the corniche of Casablanca.

Nigeria

In Nigeria, Nigerians often Celebrate the New Year's Eve by going to church; others go to nightclubs and parties organized by individuals, communities, and other organizations.

In Lagos, a year-end festival known as Lagos Countdown (later renamed One Lagos Fiesta) was first held in 2012, as part of an effort to establish tourism-oriented New Year's festivities more in line with those of other major metropolitan areas.

Rwanda
In Rwanda, Rwandans celebrate New Year's Eve by going to church, taking part in social gatherings and organizing family activities. The services usually start from 6pm for the Roman Catholic church and 10pm for the Protestants. At 00:00, at midnight, the president delivers an end-of-year address which is broadcast live on many radio and television stations. Fireworks were introduced in recent years, with the most significant displays happening at Kigali Convention Centre, Rebero Hill, Mount Kigali.

South Africa
In South Africa, South Africans vote on a top ten music countdown before 31 December.[Citation needed] When the countdown reaches number one, the song with the most votes plays on all the country's radio stations. Fireworks are lit all around South Africa. South Africans engage in occasional drinking and braais.

South Sudan
In South Sudan, South Sudanese attend church services at many churches in Juba. The service begins at 9pm. At the stroke of midnight, the famous carol, "Hark! The Herald Angels Sing" is sung to mark the end and beginning of the year with a blessing. The service ends at 12:30am.

Asia

Azerbaijan
The Gregorian calendar is still in force after Azerbaijan became an independent republic, and 1 January is celebrated as a day off. The day before, 31 December, is also marked as International Solidarity Day of Azerbaijanis, marking the double anniversary of that day in 1989 when the local residents took down the Soviet–Iranian border in then-Nakhichevan ASSR to reunite with Iranian Azerbaijanis south of the border, as well as the Istanbul-held first World Congress of Azerbaijanis which tackled issues regarding the Azeri expat communities.

Celebrations of the holiday are influenced from its Soviet history, at midnight the national anthem is played on all TV stations following the message of the President of Azerbaijan produced by state channel AzTV.

Bangladesh

The New Year celebrations take place in all around the country mostly in Dhaka, Chittagong, Sylhet, Rajshahi, Khulna, Barishal, Cox's Bazar etc. The celebrations mostly take place at night. On this day, Bangladeshis go to parties at clubs or hotels, beaches, at the crowded roadsides and bridges where firecrackers are blasted out in the sky at night. The roadsides and bridges are also lighted up by colorful lights at night. Bangladeshis do a get-together as well as enjoy with their families. That day, Cox's Bazar becomes a popular tourist destination for both Bangladeshi and foreign tourists.

Music, songs and dances are organized in the auditoriums, hotels, beaches and as well as in the grounds which are shown live concert on television where many Dhallywood celebrities along with many personalities participate in the dance, music, songs and often drama to liven up the concert more. Sometimes marriages and weddings take place in the clubs on the night of 31 December so that Bangladeshis can enjoy more. Bangladeshis also enjoy New Year's Eve with their families, relatives, and friends in the ships and yachts especially in the sea while going to Saint Martin where DJs liven up their night through their music and songs.

Muslims during the year's last Jumu'ah prayer of mosque permanently pray a Munajat, which is done all over the mosques of the country, so that Allah may bless them and the coming year can be fruitful. Hindus organize a Puja so that the coming year can be fruitful for them. The Christians go to the churches for a watch night service till midnight, praying for blessing in the coming new year as it is also part of the Christmastide season observances.

China
In China, although the celebrations of the Lunar New Year are not until a few weeks after the Gregorian New Year, celebrations of the Gregorian New Year are held in some areas, particularly in major cities. For example, celebrations with fireworks and rock concerts have taken place in Beijing's Solana Blue Harbor Shopping Park, while cultural shows and other events are held at the city's Millennium Monument, Temple of Heaven, Great Wall of China, Olympic Green, and the Summer Palace. Since 2011, a light and sound show has been held at The Bund in Shanghai, a few minutes before midnight.

Hong Kong

In Hong Kong, many gather in shopping districts like Central, Causeway Bay and Tsim Sha Tsui. Beginning in 2008, a 60-second numerical countdown to New Year's, consisting of LED lights and pyrotechnic display effects, on the facade of Two International Finance Centre was launched, followed by a fireworks display, alongside an exhibition of the Symphony of Lights. For the arrival of 2013, the Hong Kong Convention and Exhibition Centre initiated the countdown, while the fireworks display and A Symphony of Lights show were extended to eight minutes.

Shopping malls are often major celebration venues. The Times Square shopping mall, for instance, holds their own celebration of the ball drop held at Times Square, New York City. There are also various district-wide celebrations.

India
New Year's Eve celebrations are the biggest in large cities, and include Goa's beaches, Bengaluru's Brigade Road and Park Street, Kolkata.

Israel
New Year's Eve has been observed in Israel since the introduction of the Gregorian calendar in 1918; it is referred to as Silvester to distinguish it from the Jewish New Year, Rosh Hashanah, which falls in either September or October on the Gregorian calendar. It is largely celebrated through social gatherings and parties. The New Year's holiday has historically attracted a negative stigma among parts of the Israeli Jewish population due to its connection to Pope Sylvester I—who is widely considered to have been an antisemite. As a result, celebrations have historically been modest in comparison to other countries. In December 2014, wearables manufacturer Jawbone published a report estimating that only 67.4% of Israelis were awake at midnight on New Year's Eve in 2013, and most people only stayed up as late as 12:45 a.m. IST.

During the era of Mandatory Palestine in the early-1930s, promotional material for formal New Year's Eve parties and masquerade balls was targeted primarily towards Arabic and English-speaking residents (by contrast, posters for Hanukkah parties were written in Hebrew). These parties also became popular among German and Austrian Jews that had emigrated to avoid the rise of Nazi Germany. The increasing popularity of Silvester faced criticism from the Orthodox population, including the Hapoel HaMizrachi, who considered them contrary to Zionist values. In 1934, it was reported that the municipal council of Tel Aviv had passed a resolution to ban Silvester parties, calling them "contrary to the spirit and traditions of the people of Israel". However, reported efforts to ban the holiday were unsuccessful or not enforced, and it continued to increase in popularity (especially among secular populations).

Following the post-Soviet aliyah, Novy God was imported into Israel by emigrants. The observance remained obscure outside of Israel's Russian community, and also faced stigma from those who mistook its traditions for being Christmas or Silvester. In the mid-2010s, a campaign was launched to promote awareness of the holiday among the 1.5 generation of immigrants, as well as non-Russian residents. By the late-2010s, public awareness of Novy God had increased; Prime Minister Benjamin Netanyahu began to acknowledge Novy God in his holiday greetings, and it became more common for retailers to stock Novy God-related goods. In a 2020 survey, 72% of Israelis surveyed stated they were familiar with the holiday, but 54% did not perceive Novy God to be part of the country's culture.

Japan

In Japan, New Year's Eve is used to prepare for and welcome Toshigami (年神), the New Year's god. Japanese clean their homes and prepare Kadomatsu or Shimenawa to welcome the god before New Year's Eve. Buddhist temples ring their bells 108 times at midnight in the traditional Joya no Kane (除夜の鐘). The rings represent the 108 elements of bonō (煩悩), mental states that lead Japanese to take unwholesome actions.

In most cities and urban areas across Japan, New Year's Eve celebrations are usually accompanied by concerts, countdowns, fireworks and other events. In Tokyo, the two most crowded celebrations are held at the Shibuya crossing in Shibuya and the Zojoji Temple in Minato. Japanese gather around the Zojoji Temple to release helium balloons with New Year's wishes up in the sky and watch the lighting of Tokyo Tower and Tokyo Skytree with a year number displayed on the observatory at the stroke of midnight.

Three notable music-oriented television specials air near New Year's Eve. Since 1951, NHK has traditionally broadcast  (Red/White Singing Battle) on New Year's Eve, a music competition where two teams of popular musicians (the red and white teams, which predominantly contain female and male performers respectively) perform songs, with the winning team determined by a panel of judges, audience members at the NHK Hall in Tokyo, and televotes. The special is traditionally one of the most-watched television programs of the year in Japan. Although it did air on 31 December from 1959 to 2006, the Japan Record Awards ceremony, recognizing outstanding achievements in the Japanese music industry, is held annually on 30 December since 2007 and is broadcast on TBS. Since 1996, Fuji Television has broadcast Johnny's Countdown—a live concert at the Tokyo Dome organized by the talent agency Johnny & Associates. A newer tradition on New Year's Eve is mixed martial arts: promotions such as Pride Fighting Championships, DREAM, K-1 and now Rizin have hosted a large event each New Year's Eve at Saitama Super Arena since 2001. This card features highly anticipated or title fights, and even special attractions such as Rizin's 2018 NYE card, which had as its main event an exhibition between kickboxing star Tenshin Nasukawa and American boxing champion Floyd Mayweather Jr.

Kazakhstan
In Central Asia, such as Kazakhstan, New Year's Eve celebrations were inherited from Soviet traditions; thus they are similar to those of Russia. An example of such traditions would be the playing of the national anthem at midnight and the presidential address before it.

Korea
Although the traditional Korean New Year (Seollal) is typically a more important holiday in both North and South Korea, the 31 December New Year's Eve of the Gregorian calendar is also celebrated. Most cities and urban areas in both Koreas host New Year's Eve gatherings.

In Pyongyang, the capital of North Korea, the chimes of the clock at the Grand People's Study House and the national fireworks display along Kim Il-sung Square, Juche Tower and the surrounding areas signal the start of the New Year. The celebration in Pyongyang, however, also marks the beginning of the North Korean calendar or the Juche Year, which is based on 15 April 1912, Kim Il-sung's date of birth, the celebrations are more recent in origin with the fireworks displays dating from 2013. For 2018–19, Kim Il-sung Square hosted a concert performance by the state Moranbong Band, midnight fireworks, and a drone show.

In South Korea, two of the biggest celebrations take place in the capital of Seoul: the ringing of Bosingak bell 33 times at midnight and fireworks display at Myeong-dong, and an LED laser light show and fireworks display at the Lotte World Tower in Songpa-gu. Television networks KBS and SBS both broadcast award shows, the KBS Drama Awards and SBS Drama Awards, to honor achievements in the television dramas aired by the networks. South Koreans calculate their age using the East Asian age reckoning method, with all South Koreans adding a year to their age at midnight of the New Year (of the Gregorian, not the Korean calendar).

Lebanon
In Lebanon. Lebanese people celebrate New Year's Eve with a dinner attended by family and friends. The dinner features traditional dishes such as tabouli, hummus, kibbi, and other Lebanese foods. These celebrations could also take place in restaurants and clubs. Game shows are also organized where contestants can try to win money. The countdown to New Year's is broadcast through the leading TV channel and the celebrations usually continue until sunrise. Fireworks are lit throughout the night.

Malaysia

Ambang Tahun Baru, a celebration sponsored by the government was held at Merdeka Square, the field opposite the Sultan Abdul Samad Building in the Malaysian capital of Kuala Lumpur in the early days. The event was broadcast live on government as well as private TV stations at those times. Countdown is now broadcast live on Government televisions from Putrajaya and the Broadcasting Centre which the concert is held and Fireworks are displayed at the Petronas Towers.

There are New Year countdown parties in major cities such as George Town, Shah Alam and Kuching, typically organized by the private sector in these cities.

Mongolia
Mongolians began celebrating the Gregorian New Year in the Socialist period, with influence from the former Soviet Union. As a modern tradition, New Year's Eve as well as New Year's Day are public holidays, and are two of the biggest holidays of the year. They celebrate New Year's Eve with families. It is common, just like in the former Soviet Union, that the National Anthem of Mongolia is to be played at the midnight hour on television following the holiday address by the President of Mongolia.

Pakistan
New Year's Eve is usually celebrated with fireworks in big cities (e.g. Lahore, Karachi and Islamabad). Musical nights and concerts are also held.

Many Pakistani youngsters enjoy the type of celebrations held the world over. The elite and educated classes participate in night-long activities in urban and cosmopolitan cities like Karachi, Lahore, and the capital of Islamabad.

Philippines

In the Philippines, New Year's Eve (Bisperas ng Bagong Taon) is a special non-working holiday, and Filipinos usually celebrate in the company of family or close friends. Traditionally, most households would attend church for year-end services and afterwards, host or attend an abundant midnight feast called the Media Noche. Typical dishes include pancit (a noodle dish meant to symbolize for a longer life) and hamón (dry-cured ham), while lechon (roasted pig) is usually prepared as is barbecued food and various desserts. Some refrain from serving chicken, as their scratching and pecking for food is said to be an unlucky idiom for a hand-to-mouth existence. Many Filipinos also buy firecrackers and fireworks to be used in New Year's Eve, which is believed to drive away any bad luck in the start of the new year.

Many opt to wear new, bright, or colorful clothes with circular patterns, such as polka dots, or display sweets and twelve round fruits in the belief that circles attract money, while candies represent a sweeter year ahead. Several customs must be done exactly at midnight: scattering coins to increase wealth in the coming year, jumping to increase height, or the Spanish custom of eating twelve grapes, one for each month of the year. Filipinos also make loud noises by blowing on cardboard or plastic horns called torotot, banging on pots and pans, playing loud music, blowing car horns, or by lighting firecrackers and bamboo cannons. It is an apotropaic ritual, as the din is believed to scare away bad luck and evil spirits.

Although many Filipinos typically spend their New Year's Eve at their family homes, in some urban areas, many New Year's Eve parties and countdown celebrations are also hosted by the private sector with the help of the local government. These parties, which include balls hosted by hotels, usually display their own fireworks and are also well-attended.

Saudi Arabia
As Saudi Arabia has traditionally used the Umm al-Qura calendar, which is based on astronomical calculations, for administrative purposes, the Committee for the Promotion of Virtue and the Prevention of Vice (CPVPV, the Saudi religious police) has historically enforced a ban on public celebrations of the Gregorian New Year. The Saudi religious police could also fine shops for offering New Year's-related products and confiscate them. However, the religious police did not go after individual citizens holding private celebrations.

The power of the CPVPV was curtailed by the 2016 reforms of Mohammed bin Salman. On 1 October 2016, Saudi Arabia adopted the Gregorian calendar for payment of the monthly salaries of government employees (as a cost cutting measure), while retaining the Islamic calendar for religious purposes. Since then, the Saudi capital of Riyadh has become a global New Year's Eve destination with its "Riyadh Season" winter entertainment initiative. In 2022, Riyadh offered 15 entertainment zones, which include the world's biggest artificial lake, firework displays, and a Winter Wonderland that ran until December 31. Arab music stars performed on New Year's Eve at the Mohammed Abdo Arena Boulevard Riyadh City, and the Noor Riyadh citywide festival of light and art also runs through the winter.

Singapore

New Year's Eve celebrations in Singapore are centered in Marina Bay, which had hosted the Marina Bay Singapore Countdown with light shows being held in December under Shine The Light programme while fireworks at the city are not permitted on New Year's Eve. Heartland celebrations are held instead on New Year's Eve at various locations for countdown fireworks. Similarly, public transport services are extended; last MRT trains will leave City Hall at 1.15am.

Taiwan

The most prominent New Year's event in Taiwan is a major fireworks show launched from the Taipei 101 skyscraper in Taipei. In 2018, the show was enhanced by the installation of a new LED display system on the north face of the tower between its 35th and 90th floors, which can be used to display digital animation effects. This change countered a reduction in the number of firework shells launched during the show, as part of an effort to produce less pollution.

Thailand

Aside from the traditional Thai New Year Songkran (Thailand) (which falls on 13 April or 14 April), Thais also celebrate the arrival of the Gregorian New Year on 1 January with families, relatives and friends, which includes a family dinner and following different customs. It is a public holiday. In most cities and urban areas across Thailand, New Year's Eve celebrations are accompanied by countdowns, fireworks, concerts and other major events, notably, the CentralWorld Square at CentralWorld and the area along Chao Phraya River at ICONSIAM and Asiatique in Bangkok, and the Pattaya Beach in Pattaya, while public places such as hotels, pubs, restaurants and nightclubs, also host New Year's Eve parties by offering food, entertainment and music to the guests, and they usually stay open until the next morning.

Turkey

Numerous decorations and customs traditionally associated with Christmas and Bayrams are part of secular New Year's Eve celebrations in Turkey. Homes and streets are lit in glittering lights. Small gifts are exchanged, and large family dinners are organized with family and friends, featuring a special turkey dish stuffed with a zante currant, pine nuts, pimiento and dill iç pilav, dolma, hot börek, baklava, and various other Turkish dishes; accompanied with rakı, Turkish wine, boza, şerbet, salep, Turkish tea, or coffee. Even though Turks generally do not celebrate Christmas, decorating New Year trees is an emerging tradition on New Year's Eve in Turkey and Turks associate Santa Claus with New Year's Eve.

Television and radio channels are known to continuously broadcast a variety of special New Year's Eve programs, while municipalities all around the country organize fundraising events for the poor, in addition to celebratory public shows such as concerts and family-friendly events, as well as more traditional forms of entertainment such as the Karagöz and Hacivat shadow-theater, and even performances by the Mehter—the Janissary Band that was founded during the days of the Ottoman Empire.

Public and private parties with large public attendances are organized in a number of cities and towns, particularly in the largest metropolitan areas such as Istanbul, Ankara, Izmir, Adana, Bursa and Antalya, with the biggest celebrations taking place in Istanbul's Taksim, Beyoğlu, Nişantaşı and Kadıköy districts and Ankara's Kızılay Square, which generally feature dancing, concerts, laser and light shows as well as the traditional countdown and fireworks display.

In addition, at 12.00 pm, which is the moment of the new year, the president celebrates the new year of the citizens by appearing on state television and various television channels simultaneously.

United Arab Emirates

In Dubai, United Arab Emirates, the Burj Khalifa—the world's tallest building—has hosted an annual fireworks display, which is among the world's most expensive. A fireworks show was not held for 2017–18: instead, a multimedia light and sound show was presented using the tower's lighting system, which set a Guinness World Record for the largest light and sound show staged on a single building. The fireworks show returned for 2019, in tandem with a multimedia presentation.

Europe

Albania
Preparations for New Year's Eve in Albania start with the Christmas tree, which in Albania is known as "New Year's Tree" or "New Year's Pine". At midnight, Albanians toast and greet each other and fireworks are lit.

Austria
In Austria, New Year's Eve is usually celebrated with friends and family. At exactly midnight, all radio and television programmes operated by ORF broadcast the sound of the Pummerin, the bell of St. Stephen's Cathedral in Vienna, followed by the Donauwalzer ("The Blue Danube") by Johann Strauss II. Many Austrians dance to this at parties or in the street. Large crowds gather in the streets of Vienna, where the municipal government organizes a series of stages where bands and orchestras play. Fireworks are set off by both municipal governments and individuals.

Belgium
In Belgium, New Year's Eve (Sint Sylvester Vooravond ("Saint Sylvester's Eve") or Oudjaar ("old year")) is celebrated with family parties, called réveillons in the French speaking areas. On television, a stand-up comedian reviews the past year after which a musical or variety show signals midnight, when Belgians kiss, exchange good luck greetings, and toast the New Year and absent relatives and friends with champagne. Many Belgians light fireworks or go into the street to watch them. Most cities have their own fireworks display: the most famous is at Mont des Arts in Brussels. Cities, cafés and restaurants are crowded. Free bus services and special New Year's Eve taxis (the Responsible Young Drivers) bring Belgians home afterwards.

On 1 January (Nieuwjaarsdag in Dutch) children read their "New Year's letter" and give holiday greeting cards of decorated paper featuring golden cherubs and angels, colored roses and ribbon-tied garlands to parents and godparents, on decorated paper.

Belgian farmers also wish their animals a happy New Year.

Bosnia and Herzegovina
New Year is widely celebrated in Bosnia and Herzegovina. Streets are decorated for New Year's Eve and there is a fireworks show and concerts in all the larger cities. Restaurants, clubs, cafes and hotels are usually full of guests and they organize New Year's Eve parties.

In the capital Sarajevo, Bosnians gather in the Square of children of Sarajevo where a local rock band entertains them. Several trumpet and rock groups play until the early morning hours. At midnight there is a big fireworks show.

Czech Republic/Slovakia

New Year's Eve (Silvestr/Silvester) celebrations and traditions in Czech Republic and Slovakia are very similar. New Year's Eve is the noisiest day of the year. Czechs and Slovaks generally gather with friends at parties, in pubs, clubs, in the streets, or city squares to eat, drink, and celebrate the new year. Fireworks are a popular tradition; in large cities such as Bratislava, or Prague, the fireworks start before noon and steadily increase until midnight. In the first minutes after midnight, Czechs and Slovaks toast with champagne, wish each other a happy new year, fortune and health, and go outside for the fireworks.

In both countries all major TV stations air entertainment shows before and after the midnight countdown, which is followed by the National anthem of each country. The Presidents of the republics gave their New Year speech in the morning – the latest Czech President Miloš Zeman renewed the tradition of Christmas speeches. In recent years however the Czechoslovak national anthem is played at midnight, in honor of the shared history of both nations.

Denmark

Danes in Denmark may go to parties or entertain guests at home. There is a special evening meal that concludes with Kransekage, a special dessert, along with champagne. Other traditional dishes are boiled cod, stewed kale and cured saddle of pork. However, expensive cuts of beef as well as sushi have become increasingly popular.

Multiple significant traditional events are broadcast on television and radio on 31 December. This includes, but is not limited to:

The monarch's New Year message from Amalienborg Palace at 18:00 and the Town Hall Clock in Copenhagen striking midnight. Thousands of Danes gather together in Rådhuspladsen (the Town Hall Square) and cheer.

The Royal Guard parade in their red gala uniforms. The climax of the celebration is fireworks launched as the Town Hall Tower bells chime on the stroke of midnight. After midnight, all radio & television stations play: "" [Danish new year's hymn] and followed by "Kong Christian stod ved højen mast" [Danish Royal Anthem] and "Der er et yndigt land" [Danish National Anthem].

Like in the surrounding nations, the German comedy sketch Dinner for One is broadcast every year at 23:45, and ends just minutes before the new year. This has been a tradition every year since 1980 (except in 1985).

Another reoccurring broadcast is the 1968 film The Party, which is aired after midnight on 1 January.

Estonia
To celebrate New Year's Eve in Estonia, Estonians decorate villages, visit friends and prepare lavish meals.

Some believe that Estonians should eat seven, nine, or twelve times on New Year's Eve. These are lucky numbers in Estonia; it is believed that for each meal consumed, the person gains the strength of that many men the following year. Meals should not be completely finished—some food should be left for ancestors and spirits who visit the house on New Year's Eve.

Traditional New Year food includes pork with sauerkraut or Estonian sauerkraut (mulgikapsad), baked potatoes and swedes with hog's head, and white and blood sausage. Vegetarians can eat potato salad with navy beet and pâté. Gingerbread and marzipan are very popular for dessert. Traditional New Year drinks include beer and mead, but mulled wine and champagne have become modern favourites.

Finland

In Finland, New Year's Eve is usually celebrated with family or friends. Late supper is served, often featuring wieners, Janssons frestelse, and potato salad. Some municipalities organize fireworks at midnight. Consumer fireworks are also very popular. A Finnish tradition is molybdomancy – to tell the fortunes of the New Year by melting "tin" (actually lead) in a tiny pan on the stove and throwing it quickly in a bucket of cold water. The resulting blob of metal is analyzed, for example by interpreting shadows it casts by candlelight. These predictions are however never taken seriously.

YLE broadcasts the reception of the New Year at Helsinki Senate Square. The countdown to the New Year is with the Helsinki Cathedral clock. In the afternoon programme, the German comedy sketch Dinner for One is shown every year. On the radio, just before midnight, the poem Hymyilevä Apollo (Smiling Apollo) by Eino Leino is read.

France

In France, New Year's Eve (la Saint-Sylvestre) is usually celebrated with a feast, le Réveillon de la Saint-Sylvestre (Cap d'Any in Northern Catalonia). This feast customarily includes special dishes including foie gras, seafood such as oysters, and champagne. The celebration can be a simple, intimate dinner with friends and family or, une soirée dansante, a much fancier ball.

On New Year's Day (le Jour de l'An) friends and family exchange New Year's resolutions, kisses, and wishes. Some people eat ice cream.

Germany
In Germany, parties are common on New Year's Eve (Silvester), and wishes of luck may be worded as „Guten Rutsch ins neue Jahr!“, which literally translates into “Good slide into the new year!” or “Slide well into the new year!”, as well as „Prost Neujahr!“ for “Cheers (to the) New Year!” or „Frohes Neues!“ literally meaning “Happy new one!” Fireworks are very popular, both with individuals and at large municipal displays. 31 December and the three days leading up to it are the only four days of the year on which fireworks may be sold in Germany. Every year Berlin hosts one of the largest New Year's Eve celebrations in all of Europe, attended by over a million Germans. The focal point is the Brandenburg Gate, where midnight fireworks are centered, with a live broadcast on ZDF under the name Willkommen with musical guests beginning in 2011. Germans toast the New Year with a glass of Sekt (German sparkling wine) or champagne. Molybdomancy  is another German New Year's Eve tradition, which involves telling fortunes by the shapes made by molten lead dropped into cold water. Other auspicious actions are to touch a chimney sweep or rub some ash on one's forehead for good luck and health. Jam-filled doughnuts with or without alcoholic fillings are eaten. Finally a tiny marzipan pig is consumed for more good luck. In some northern regions of Germany (e.g. It looks similar to a pancake, but the recipe calls for either dark molasses or dark syrup, topped with a few mettwurst slices and bacon strips.

Another notable tradition is watching the British comedy sketch Dinner for One, which has traditionally been broadcast on German television on New Year's Eve since 1972. The version traditionally broadcast on German television was originally recorded in 1963, and was occasionally used as filler programming by NDR due to popular demand; in 1972, Dinner for One received its traditional New Year's Eve scheduling. The sketch, as well as its catchphrase "the same procedure as every year", are well known in German pop culture. Dinner for One is also broadcast on or around New Year's Eve in other European countries, although it is, ironically, relatively unknown in the United Kingdom.

In 2023 On New Year's Eve in Berlin, the fire department reported 38 separate incidents, including 14 cases where firetrucks were supposedly "lured into ambushes" and shot at with fireworks and pelted with beer crates.The level of aggression toward emergency service staff was completely unexpected, Berlin fire department spokesman Thomas Kirstein told public radio RBB. A total of 15 emergency responders were injured in Berlin, with one requiring hospital treatment. The police department said 18 of its officers had been injured. 

Berlin's fire department said it was "shocked and saddened" by the incidents, which left many asking what lies behind the apparent increase in violence toward emergency service staff and why they in particular have become a target.

Greece
A midnight fireworks display is held over the historic Parthenon temple in the capital of Athens.

A common tradition among Greek Orthodox families is the cutting of a vasilopita ("King's pie" or "St. Basil's pie") at midnight. A coin or similar object is usually baked inside, and whoever finds it is said to have luck over the next year. New Year's Day is considered a feast day for Basil of Caesarea, and it is also considered a custom to reserve the first slice of the vasilopita for St. Basil.

Hungary

New Year's Eve (Szilveszter) in Hungary is celebrated with home parties and street parties, including a gathering in downtown Budapest. Fireworks and firecrackers are popular. Champagne, wine and traditional Hungarian New Year dishes—frankfurter sausages with horseradish, lentil soup, fish, and roast pig—are consumed. The national anthem is commonly sung at midnight.

Television channels usually broadcast comedic and musical programs most of the day and in the evening. At midnight, a countdown is followed by the national anthem and the President's speech (which is usually pre-recorded).

In past centuries, some Hungarians believed that animals were able to speak on New Year's Eve, and that onion skins sprinkled with salt could indicate a rainy month.

Hungarian Christian communities focus on celebrating Mass on both New Year's Eve and New Year's Day.

Iceland

Fireworks are very popular in Iceland, particularly on New Year's Eve. Iceland's biggest New Year's Eve events are usually in and around the capital, Reykjavík.

Since the 1940s, state broadcaster RÚV has traditionally broadcast Áramótaskaupið (literally The New Year's Comedy or The New Year's Lampoon), a special which features comedy sketches satirizing the events and news headlines of the past year. Originating from radio and later moving to television, the special is the most-watched television program of the year in Iceland (with an estimated 75% of the population having watched the special in 2018, across 98% of all televisions in the country).

Some of its sketches have become well known in local popular culture—such as a 1989 sketch that portrayed then Minister of Finance Ólafur Ragnar Grímsson as a Batman-esque superhero known as "Skattmann" ("Taxman"), and a 2008 sketch—satirizing protests of the Icelandic financial crisis—which popularized "Helvítis fokking fokk!" as an expression of frustration towards the crisis.

Ireland
New Year's Eve (Oíche Chinn Bliana, Oíche na Coda Móire, or Oíche Chaille, the night of big portion) when traditionally households would partake in a large feast that was believed to ensure a plentiful new year. Beliefs around the day meant that no food or other goods would be taken from the house, to guard against less or hunger in the year to come, believing that if anything was taken from the house on this day the house would remain empty for the year and have no luck. It was traditional for no water to be drawn from a well after sunset. Even the homeless and those in need would not be offered food or alms on this day. In many of the country, a large barmbrack would be baked during the day, with the man of the house taking three large bites of the cake in the evening, and throwing it against the inside of the front door as an offering to the Holy Trinity. An invocation accompanied this:"Fógraímíd an gorta

Amach to tír na dTurcach;

Ó 'nocht go bliain ó 'nocht

Agus 'nocht féin amach"This translates as "We warn famine to retire, To the land of the Turks; From tonight to this night twelve months, And from this night itself." The bits of cake would be gathered, and eaten by the family. Other variations include throwing the cake to someone outside the door, or conducting the ritual in the stables or other animal housing. Church bells ringing, the lighting of bonfires, and singing would take place towards midnight.

In modern times, celebrations in major cities are modest, with most Irish Citizens favoring small parties in the home for family and friends.

Italy
In Italy, New Year's Eve ( or Notte di San Silvestro) is celebrated by the observation of traditional rituals, such as wearing red underwear. An ancient tradition in southern regions which is rarely followed today was disposing of old or unused items by dropping them from the window.

Dinner is traditionally eaten with relatives and friends. It often includes zampone or cotechino (a meal made with pig's trotters or entrails), and lentils. At 20:30, the President of the Republic reads a television message of greetings to Italians.

At midnight, fireworks are displayed all across the country. Rarely followed today is the tradition that consist in eating lentil stew when the bell tolls midnight, one spoonful per bell. This is supposed to bring good fortune; the round lentils represent coins.

On television, Rai 1 broadcasts a special to welcome the New Year at 21:00 called L'anno che verrà with musical guests, surprises and many more.

Malta
Malta organized its first New Year's street party in 2009 in Floriana. The event was not highly advertised and proved controversial, due to the closing of an arterial street for the day. In 2010 there were the first national celebrations in St. George's Square, Valletta Although professional fireworks are very popular in Malta, they are almost totally absent on New Year's Eve. Maltese Usually hit nightclubs and specific dance music parties to celebrate New Year's Eve.

Montenegro
In Montenegro, New Year's Eve celebrations are held in all large cities, usually accompanied by fireworks. It is usually celebrated with family or friends, at home or outside. Restaurants, clubs, cafés and hotels organize celebrations with food and music.

Netherlands
New Year's Eve (Oud en Nieuw or Oudejaarsavond) in the Netherlands is usually celebrated as a cozy evening with family or friends, although Dutch Citizens attend big organized parties. Traditional snack foods are oliebollen (Dutch doughnuts) and appelbeignets (apple slice fritters). On television, the main feature is the oudejaarsconference, a performance by one of the major Dutch cabaretiers (comparable to stand-up comedy, but more serious, generally including a satirical review of the year's politics). Historically, in Reformed Protestant families, Psalm 90 is read, although this tradition is now fading away. At midnight, Glühwein (bishops wine) or champagne is drunk. Many Dutch Citizens light their own fireworks. City centres are usually intensely crowded, and large crowds combined with the fire quickly turn into a safety hazard.  Towns do not organize a central fireworks display, except for Rotterdam where the national fireworks display can be seen near the Erasmus Bridge.Additionally, there are certain types of fireworks that are banned. In rural areas, the tradition of :nl:Carbidschieten (blasting off footballs or churnlids with Calcium carbide gas filled milk churns) is performed instead of lighting fireworks.

Macedonia
New Year's Eve is celebrated across North Macedonia. New Year's Day is celebrated by day-long fireworks shows. The day is celebrated together with family or friends at home or in restaurants, clubs, cafés and hotels. During the daytime celebration, children get gifts. Evening celebrations include food, music, and dancing to both traditional Macedonian folk music, and modern music. New Year's Eve is celebrated on 31 December and also on 14 January according to the Macedonian Orthodox Calendar.

Norway

In Norway, New Year's Eve (Nyttårsaften) is the second biggest celebration of the year, after Christmas Eve. While Christmas Eve is a family celebration, New Year's Eve is an opportunity to celebrate with friends.

Traditionally, there is first a feast, commonly consisting of stuffed, roast turkey with potatoes, sprouts, gravy and Waldorf salad. The accompanying beverage is traditionally beer (commonly either Christmas beer or lager beer). Dessert will often be vanilla pudding or rice cream, and there will be cakes and coffee later in the evening – commonly accompanied by a glass of cognac. Then, at close to midnight on New Year's Day, Norwegians will go outside to send up fireworks. Fireworks are only permitted to be sold to the general public on the days leading up to New Year's Eve, and only to be launched that night.

Due to the general use of fireworks, more fires occur on New Year's Eve than on any other day of the year in Norway. Accordingly, most Norwegian cities, and many towns, host a large, public fireworks display in order to discourage private use of fireworks in built-up areas. Norwegians will then congregate in a central square or similar to watch and celebrate.

Poland
In Poland, New Year's Eve (Sylwester) celebrations include both indoor and outdoor festivities. A large open-air concert is held in the Main Square in Kraków. 150,000 to 200,000 revelers celebrate the New Year with live music and a fireworks display over St. Mary's Basilica. Similar festivities are held in other cities around Poland.

For those who do not wish to spend the New Year in the city, the mountains are a popular destination. Zakopane, located in the Carpathian Mountains, is the most popular Polish mountain resort in winter.

Also, New Year's Eve (Sylwester) celebrations are in Katowice, near the Spodek arena. In Sławatycze, Polish Citizens tour the streets dressed up as bearded men.

Major television networks broadcast the events live all across the country on New Year's Eve like Polsat and TVP.

Portugal

In Portugal, the New Year celebration is taken very seriously. The tradition is to drink champagne and eat twelve raisins – one for each month of the year, making a wish for each. Another Portuguese tradition is a special cake called Bolo-Rei (literally: King Cake). Bolo-Rei is a round cake with a large hole in the centre, resembling a crown covered with crystallized and dried fruit. It is baked from a soft, white dough, with raisins, various nuts and crystallized fruit. Inside is hidden the characteristic fava (broad bean). Tradition dictates that whoever finds the fava has to pay for the Bolo-Rei next year. Initially, a small prize (usually a small metal toy) was also included within the cake. However, the inclusion of the prize was forbidden by the European Union for safety reasons. The Portuguese brought the recipe of the Gateau des Rois from France in the second half of the 19th century. To this day, this recipe is a very well kept secret.

In Lisbon, the New Year is celebrated with a grand concert. The New Year's Concert is held at the CCB (Centro Cultural de Belém) on the evening of 1 January, featuring the prestigious Lisbon Metropolitan Orchestra.

Romania

Traditional celebrations of New Year's Eve (Revelion) are the norm in Romania. Romanians follow centuries-old customs, rituals, and conventions. Children sing "Plugușorul" and "Sorcova", traditional carols that wish goodwill, happiness and success.

Parties are common in the evening. Since the Romanian Revolution of 1989, Romanians have gathered in the University Square in Bucharest. Other significant parties occur in Piața Constituției. New Year's Eve is also marked by a national all-night telecast on Romanian Television, which also celebrates its anniversary on this holiday, having opened its doors in the New Year's Eve of 1956.

Russia

The most prominent public celebration of the New Year (Novy God) is held at Moscow's Red Square under the Kremlin Clock—whose chimes at midnight are traditionally followed by the playing of the Russian national anthem, and a fireworks display. The President's New Year's address is traditionally televised shortly before midnight in each time zone, reflecting on the previous year and the state of the country. In 1999, unpopular president Boris Yeltsin famously used the New Year's address to announce his resignation.

Novy God is practiced as a gift-giving holiday with similarities to Christmas; New Year trees (yolka) are decorated and displayed in homes and public spaces, and Ded Moroz is depicted as delivering presents to children on New Year's Eve (similarly to the Western figure of Santa Claus) with assistance from his granddaughter Snegurochka.

The present-day traditions were established under Soviet rule, when the Communist Party abolished Christmas and other religious holidays in 1928 as part of its anti-religion policies. In 1935, Soviet officials, including politician Pavel Postyshev, began promoting the New Year as a non-working holiday in the benefit of youth. Christmas traditions were adapted in a secular form. Even after the dissolution of the Soviet Union and the reinstatement of religious holidays, Novy God has remained a popular celebration in modern Russia, and among Soviet and Russian expats living in other countries.

Serbia
The Gregorian calendar was adopted by Yugoslavia in 1919, but the Serbian Orthodox Church continues to follow the Julian calendar, meaning that the new year is often celebrated twice. Prior to World War II, the New Year's holiday was celebrated more often by Serbs in urban regions, with large parties held on both 1 and 14 January. By contrast, residents of rural regions rarely celebrated the new year, and placed a larger focus on Christmas.

In 1945 after World War II, the League of Communists of Yugoslavia came into power, and the Kingdom of Yugoslavia was succeeded by the Socialist Federal Republic of Yugoslavia (SFR Yugoslavia). As in the Soviet Union, the communist government discouraged the observance of religious holidays, encouraged celebrations of the New Year on 1 January as a secular gift-giving holiday, and similarly adopted the figure of Grandfather Frost (Deda Mraz). Some residents (especially those in opposition to the communist government) continued to celebrate the Orthodox New Year, doing so quietly by candlelight in order to evade attention from authorities.

After the end of communist rule and the breakup of Yugoslavia, the three holidays began to co-exist: the Gregorian New Year and the Serbian New Year (14 January) are both marked by festivities in major Serbian cities, although festivities for the Serbian New Year (which became designated as a public holiday again in 2013) are usually modest in comparison to their Gregorian counterparts.

Slovenia
As in the other constituents of SFR Yugoslavia, Christmas and other religious holidays were abolished by the communist government in the mid-1940s, with the New Year promoted as a secular holiday in the place of Saint Nicholas Day and Christmas. Grandfather Frost is refereed to in Slovenian as "Dedek Mraz", and was originally billed as having come from Siberia. After Yugoslavia broke from the Eastern Bloc, the character was stated to come from the Triglav mountain instead, and artist Maksim Gaspari created a new depiction of Dedek Mraz in traditional Slovenian apparel.

Saint Nicholas Day and Christmas were reinstated as holidays after the end of communist rule.

Spain

In Spain, the main public celebration of New Year's Eve (Nochevieja, literally "Old Night", or Fin de Año) is held at Puerta del Sol in Madrid, where revellers await the midnight chimes of the clock tower at the Royal House of the Post Office. A notable Spanish tradition is to eat twelve grapes at midnight—one for each chime of the clock—which is said to bring luck and prosperity. The tradition dates back as early as 1895 but first gained wider attention in 1909, when it was promoted by Alicante grape growers to help spur sales of that year's surplus harvest. In the lead-up to the holiday, grocery stores are usually stocked with large amounts of grapes. The tradition has also been adopted in other communities with cultural ties to Spain or Latin America, including Hispanic and Latino Americans.

It is common to attend cotillones de nochevieja that last into the following morning, including smaller parties at bars and larger-scale events at hotels. After midnight, Spaniards often drink sparkling wines such as cava and champagne.

A  race known as the San Silvestre Vallecana is also held in Madrid on the evening of New Year's Eve, which includes an amateur fun run and a competitive event for elite athletes. In 2012 the event hosted a record of around 40,000 runners.

Sweden

In Sweden, New Year's Eve is usually celebrated with families or with friends. A few hours before and after midnight, Swedish citizens usually party and eat a special dinner, often three courses. New Year's Eve is celebrated with large fireworks displays throughout the country, especially in the cities. Swedish citizens over the age of 18 are allowed to buy fireworks, which are sold by local stores or by private people. While watching or lighting fireworks at midnight, Swedish citizens usually drink champagne.

The Swedish lottery television show BingoLotto features a special New Year's Eve edition to commemorate the holiday with musical guests, four bingo games, and surprises.

Switzerland
In Switzerland, New Year's Eve is typically celebrated in private gatherings or public events.

The final of the Spengler Cup ice hockey tournament is traditionally held on New Year's Eve.

Ukraine

The main public celebration is held at Maidan Nezalezhnosti in Kyiv, including concerts, the singing of the National Anthem at midnight, and a fireworks display, aired on UA:PBC. For 2013–14, amid the Euromaidan movement, it also included a world record attempt at the largest simultaneous singing of a national anthem. Similar celebrations are held in all other major cities and regional capitals.

Under Soviet rule, Ukrainian New Year's celebrations became patterned off the secular Novy God traditions, with Christmas (which, among those who practice Eastern Christianity, is held on January 7) officially considered abolished—if not celebrated in secret by those opposed to the communist regime. Christmas regained prominence after the dissolution, with figures such as Grandfather Frost eventually being displaced by figures such as Saint Nicholas and Santa Claus.

As in other former Soviet countries, The Irony of Fate was also regularly screened on or around the New Year in Ukraine; in 2015, broadcaster STB pulled the film as part of a wider boycott of Russian films in response to the 2014 Russian annexation of Crimea (citing, in particular, a lead actress who had been blacklisted by the Ukraine government for her support of the invasion). Nationalists have also criticized the practice of New Year trees for similar reasons despite being of Western origin.

United Kingdom

England

The most prominent New Year's Eve (Old Year's Night) celebration in England is that of Central London, where the arrival of midnight is greeted with the chimes of Big Ben. In recent years, a major fireworks display has also been held, with fireworks launched from the nearby London Eye Ferris wheel. On New Year's Eve 2010, an estimated 250,000 Brits gathered to view an eight-minute fireworks display around and above the London Eye which was, for the first time, set to a musical soundtrack. The 2020–21 and 2021-22 events did not admit any spectators because of the COVID-19 pandemic, but instead used a drone and fireworks show.

Other major New Year events are held in the cities of Birmingham, Manchester, Leeds, Liverpool, and Newcastle.

Scotland

In Scotland, New Year's (Hogmanay) is celebrated with several different customs, such as First-Footing, which involves friends or family members going to each other's houses with a gift of whisky and sometimes a lump of coal.

Edinburgh, the Scottish capital, hosts one of the world's most famous New Year celebrations. The celebration is focused on a major street party along Princes Street. The cannon is fired at Edinburgh Castle at the stroke of midnight, followed by a large fireworks display. Edinburgh hosts a festival of four or five days, beginning on 28 December, and lasting until New Year's Day or 2 January, which is also a bank holiday in Scotland.

Other cities across Scotland, such as Aberdeen, Glasgow and Stirling have large organised celebrations too, including fireworks at midnight.

BBC Scotland broadcast the celebrations in Edinburgh to a Scottish audience, with the celebrations also screened across the world. STV covers both worldwide New Year celebrations, and details of events happening around Scotland.

Wales

The Welsh tradition of giving gifts and money on New Year's Day is an ancient custom that survives in modern-day Wales, though nowadays it is now customary to give bread and cheese.

Thousands of Welsh citizens descend every year on Cardiff to enjoy live music, catering, ice-skating, funfairs, and fireworks. Many of the celebrations take place at Cardiff Castle and Cardiff City Hall.

Every New Year's Eve, the Nos Galan road race (Rasys Nos Galan), a  running contest, is held in Mountain Ash in the Cynon Valley, Rhondda Cynon Taf, South Wales. The race celebrates the life and achievements of Welsh runner Guto Nyth Brân.

Founded in 1958 by local runner Bernard Baldwin, it is run over the five-kilometre route of Guto's first competitive race. The main race starts with a church service at Llanwynno, and then a wreath is laid on Guto's grave in Llanwynno graveyard. After lighting a torch, it is carried to the nearby town of Mountain Ash, where the main race takes place.

The race consists of a double circuit of the town Centre, starting in Henry Street and ending in Oxford Street, by the commemorative statue of Guto. Traditionally, the race was timed to end at midnight, but in recent times it was rescheduled for the convenience of family entertainment, now concluding at around 9pm.

This has resulted in a growth in size and scale, and the proceedings now start with an afternoon of street entertainment, and fun run races for children, concluding with the church service, elite runners' race, and presentations.

North America

Canada
New Year's Eve traditions and celebrations in Canada vary regionally, but are typically similar to those in the United States, with a focus on social gatherings and public celebrations (such as concerts and fireworks displays).

The CBC's English- and French-language television networks have been well known for airing sketch comedy specials on New Year's Eve, lampooning the major events and news stories of the year. From 1992 through 2019, CBC Television aired Year of the Farce, an annual special produced by the comedy troupe Royal Canadian Air Farce. The special was part of a weekly Royal Canadian Air Farce television series beginning in 1993, while the 2008 edition doubled as the program's series finale. The troupe continued to produce Year of the Farce as an annual reunion special until 2019.

The CBC's French network Ici Radio-Canada Télé airs a similar special, Bye Bye, which has been presented by various comedians and troupes, Originally running from 1968 to 1998, it was revived in 2006 by the Québécois troupe Rock et Belles Oreilles. Its 2008 edition, hosted and co-produced by Québécois television personality Véronique Cloutier, was criticized for featuring sketches that viewers perceived as offensive, including sketches making fun of English Canadians and American president-elect Barack Obama. Four out of the five highest-rated television programs in Quebecois history have been editions of Bye Bye, with the 2021 edition being seen by a record 4.862 million viewers.

Since 2017 (with the inaugural edition marking the beginning of the country's sesquicentennial year), CBC Television has broadcast a more traditional countdown special: a localized version is broadcast for each time zone, which features music performances and midnight festivities from across the country.

The Canadian men's junior hockey team has usually played their final preliminary round game at the IIHF World Junior Hockey Championship on New Year's Eve, most often against the United States.

Costa Rica
In Costa Rica, families usually gather around 8pm for parties that last until 1 or 2am, the next day. There are several traditions among Costa Rican families, including eating 12 grapes representing 12 wishes for the new year, and running across the street with luggage to bring new trips and adventures in the upcoming year.

El Salvador
In El Salvador, New Year's Eve is spent with families. Family parties start around 5:00pm, and last until 1:00 to 3:00am, the following day. Families eat dinner together and sing traditional New Year's Eve songs, such as "Cinco para las Doce". After the dinner, individuals light fireworks and continue partying outside. A radio station broadcasts a countdown to midnight. When the clock strikes midnight, fireworks are lit across the country. Salvadorans start exchanging hugs and wishes for the new year.

The main event takes place at midnight where fireworks are lit along with thousands of life-size effigies called "Año Viejo". Almost every local family will either make such an effigy from scraps of paper and old clothes or buy one ready-made. The effigy is placed just outside the front of their home. Such effigies represent the things people hated about the departing year and are fashioned to resemble celebrities, politicians, public servants, cartoon characters etc. They are burnt on the stroke of midnight to banish the old year and mark a fresh start in the new. Some of the braver Ecuadorians jump through these burning effigies 12 times to represent a wish for every month.

Guatemala
In Guatemala, banks close on New Year's Eve, and businesses close at noon. In the town of Antigua, Guatemalans usually gather at the Santa Catalina Clock Arch to celebrate New Year's Eve. In Guatemala City the celebrations are centered on Plaza Mayor. Firecrackers are lit starting at sundown, continuing without interruption into the night. Guatemalans wear new clothes for good fortune and eat a grape with each of the twelve chimes of the bell during the New Year countdown, while making a wish with each one.

The celebrations include religious themes which may be either Mayan or Catholic. Catholic celebrations are similar to those at Christmas. Gifts are left under the tree on Christmas morning by the Christ Child for the children, but parents and adults do not exchange gifts until New Year's Day.

Mexico
Mexicans celebrate New Year's Eve, (Spanish: "Víspera de Año Nuevo" o "Noche Vieja") by eating a grape with each of the twelve chimes of a clock's bell during the midnight countdown, while making a wish with each one. Mexican families decorate homes and parties in colors that represent wishes for the upcoming year: red encourages an overall improvement of lifestyle and love, yellow encourages blessings of improved employment conditions, green for improved financial circumstances, and white for improved health. Mexican sweet bread is baked with a coin or charm hidden in the dough. When the bread is served, the recipient of the slice with the coin or charm is said to be blessed with good luck in the New Year . Another tradition is to make a list of all the bad or unhappy events over the past 12 months; before midnight, this list is thrown into a fire, symbolizing the removal of negative energy from the new year. At the same time, they are expressed for all the good things during the year that is ending so that they will continue in the new year.

Mexicans celebrate with a late-night dinner with their families, the traditional meal being turkey or pork loin. Afterwards many Mexicans attend parties outside the home, for example, in night clubs. In Mexico City a street festival on New Year's Eve takes place on the Zocalo, the city's main square. After the twelfth chime, Mexicans will shout and wish each other a "¡Feliz Año Nuevo!" and, in many places, celebrations also include fireworks, firecrackers and sparklers.

Panama
In Panama, Panamanians usually celebrate New Year's Eve with a dinner, followed by multiple individual fireworks celebrations. Fireworks begin around 11pm for parties that last until 1am, the next day. Many Panamanians leave the city and go to the rural towns across the country, to celebrate with families and friends.

Trinidad and Tobago
In Port of Spain the tradition is to celebrate in one's yard with friends, families and neighbors, and eat and drink till sunrise. At midnight the city becomes festive with fireworks in every direction. The celebration only starts at midnight. Music is heard from all the houses and bars, nightclubs, street parties, and Soca raves. Trinidadians and Tobagonians celebrate not only the new year but the beginning of the carnival season as well.

United States

In the United States, New Year's Eve is celebrated via a variety of social gatherings, and large-scale public events such as concerts, fireworks shows, and "drops"—an event inspired by time balls where an item is lowered or raised over the course of the final minute of the year.

The event has been held since 1907, and the ball itself—which is adorned with Waterford Crystal panels and an LED lighting system—has been displayed atop the building year-round since 2009. Drop events often use either a ball in imitation of Times Square, or items that represent local culture or history (such as Atlanta's Peach Drop, which reflects Georgia's identity as the "Peach State").

New York City and Times Square serve as the focal point for national media coverage of the holiday. Bandleader Guy Lombardo and his band—The Royal Canadians—were well known for their annual broadcast from New York City. Their signature performance of "Auld Lang Syne" at midnight helped make the standard synonymous with the holiday. Beginning on radio in 1929, Lombardo moved to CBS television from 1956 to 1976, adding coverage of the ball drop. Following Lombardo's death, Dick Clark's New Year's Rockin' Eve (which premiered for 1973 on NBC, and moved to ABC for 1975) became the dominant New Year's Eve special on U.S. television—especially among younger viewers—with Dick Clark having anchored New Year's coverage (including New Year's Rockin' Eve and the one-off ABC 2000 Today) for 32 straight years. After Clark suffered a stroke in December 2004, Regis Philbin guest hosted the 2005 edition. Due to a lingering speech impediment brought upon by the stroke, Clark retired as host and was succeeded by Ryan Seacrest for 2006, but continued making limited appearances on the special until his death in 2012.

Also in New York City, the Cathedral of St. John the Divine hosts the New Year's Eve Concert for Peace. The Concert for Peace was founded by Leonard Bernstein in 1984 as a tribute to the people of New York City. It has since become part of New York's new year's eve traditions.

Other notable celebrations include the Las Vegas Strip's "America's Party", which consists of a ticketed concert event at the Fremont Street Experience, and a public fireworks show at midnight that is launched from various casino resorts on the Strip. Nashville has typically held concerts featuring country music performers. Los Angeles, a city long without a major public New Year celebration, held an inaugural gathering in Downtown's newly completed Grand Park to celebrate the arrival of 2014. The event included food trucks, art installations, and culminated with a projection mapping show on the side of Los Angeles City Hall near midnight. The inaugural event drew over 25,000 spectators and participants. For 2016, Chicago introduced an event known as Chi-Town Rising. Alongside the festivities in Times Square, New York's Central Park hosts a "Midnight Run" event organized by the New York Road Runners, which features a fireworks show and a footrace around the park that begins at the stroke of midnight. Since 2014–15, musician Pitbull has hosted a New Year's Eve concert at Miami's Bayfront Park (which was initially televised as a New Year's special on Fox, Pitbull's New Year's Revolution, until 2017–18).

Major theme parks also hold New Year's celebrations; Disney theme parks, such as Walt Disney World Resort in Orlando, Florida and Disneyland in Anaheim, California, are traditionally the busiest around the Christmas and New Year's holidays.

Oceania

Australia

Each major city in Australia holds New Year's Eve celebrations, usually accompanied by a fireworks display and other events. The most prominent celebration in the country is Sydney New Year's Eve, which takes place at Sydney Harbour and consists of two fireworks shows — the evening "Family Fireworks" held at 9:00 p.m., followed by the main fireworks at midnight. Sydney Harbour Bridge is a focal point of the show, via pyrotechnics launched from the bridge, as well as lighting displays that illuminate it during the show—colloquially known as the "bridge effect", and previously taking the form of a symbol on its trusses that reflected an annual theme.

Gloucester Park, a racecourse in central Perth, is the largest and most recognized display in the Western Australian city. In Brisbane events are held at Southbank. At night, 50,000 Australians gather at sites around the Brisbane River to watch a fireworks display. In Melbourne, hundreds of thousands of Australians come to the Central Business District to see the fireworks. In the South Australian capital of Adelaide, events are held at both Rymill Park in the city, Semaphore and at Glenelg beach.

Kiribati
Kiritimati (UTC+14) part of Kiribati (and other Kiribati's Line Islands, especially populated Tabuaeran and Teraina), is one of the first locations in the world to welcome the New Year. Other Kiribati islands follow at UTC+13 and UTC+12.

New Zealand
Many of New Zealand's cities and towns see in the new year with open-air concerts and fireworks displays.

Auckland regularly has a fireworks display at midnight from the top of the Sky Tower. In Wellington, Frank Kitts Park is the venue for a festival including fireworks, music, and open-air film displays. Similar events occur in Hamilton, starting with a family-friendly event at Steele Park, followed by an adult-specific party at SkyCity Hamilton. Gisborne, one of the first cities in the world to see sunrise at new year also celebrates with a new year festival. The small town of Whangamata, on the Coromandel Peninsula, is a major party venue in the new year, especially for Aucklanders.

In the South Island, both Christchurch and Dunedin host free live music concerts culminating with a midnight fireworks display. These are held at Hagley Park and The Octagon respectively. The South Island's main resort town, Queenstown is also a major new year party venue, with music and fireworks.

Samoa
Since changing the time zone from UTC-11 to UTC+13 in winter and UTC+14 in summer (including new year), Samoa is the first country to receive the New Year as a whole, sharing it with some parts of Kiribati.

South America

Argentina

Traditional celebrations in Argentina include a family dinner of traditional dishes, including vitel tonné, asado, sandwiches de miga, piononos. Like dessert: turrón, mantecol and pan dulce.

Just before midnight, Argentines flock to the streets to enjoy fireworks and light firecrackers. The fireworks can be seen in any terrace. The first day of the New Year is celebrated at midnight with cider or champagne. Argentines wish each other a happy New Year, and sometimes share a toast with neighbours. Parties often continue until dawn. Citizens in La Plata have a long tradition of making giant dolls, mostly of paper and wood, although sometimes also incorporating fireworks, which are burnt after the stroke of midnight.

The celebration is during the summer, like in many South American countries, so many families in the New Year are seen at tourist centers of the Argentine Atlantic coast (Mar del Plata, Necochea, Villa Gesell, Miramar, etc.).

Brazil

In Brazil, Brazilians typically celebrate New Year's Eve at large parties hosted by restaurants and clubs; local traditions determine who opens a bottle of Champagne at midnight. People often wear colors with religious symbolism on New Year's Eve, such as white for good luck, yellow for good energies, happiness and money, red for love. Rituals such as the consumption of grapes, lychees and lentils also take place due to this mixture.

The most prominent public celebration in Brazil is a fireworks display on Copacabana Beach in Rio de Janeiro, which is one of the world's largest. In 2017, it was estimated that the fireworks would attract over three million spectators to welcome 2018. On television, the most prominent New Year's Eve special is TV Globo's , which features pre-recorded concert performances (usually filmed from a different Brazilian city annually), and live coverage of New Year's celebrations across the country 

Brasília holds a public celebration on the Monumental Axis or Estádio Nacional Mané Garrincha. Celebrations in Manaus are centered upon a fireworks display on the Rio Negro Bridge, while Paulista Avenue hosts the main celebration in São Paulo, Brazil's largest city.

Another notable New Year's Eve tradition in São Paulo is the Saint Silvester Road Race, a 15K run through the city's Central Zone. Held annually since 1925, its route incorporates several major streets and landmarks, including the Viaduto do Chá and Paulista Avenue.

Chile

New Year's Eve is celebrated in Chile by the observation of various traditions, such as wearing yellow underwear and watching fireworks. Chileans who want to travel walk the streets with a suitcase in hand, others hold money in their hand or place coins at their door for good fortune in the new year. Celebrations include a family dinner with special dishes, usually lentils for good luck, and twelve grapes to symbolize wishes for each month of the coming year. Family celebrations usually last until midnight, then some continue partying with friends until dawn. In Chile's capital Santiago, thousands of Chileans gather at the Entel Tower to watch the countdown to midnight and a fireworks display.

There are several fireworks shows across the country, and over one million spectators attend the most popular, the "Año Nuevo en el Mar", in Valparaiso. Since 2000, the sale of fireworks to individuals has been illegal, meaning fireworks can now only be observed at fireworks displays during major events.

Colombia
In Colombia it is a traditional celebration. There are many traditions across the country, including a family dinner with special dishes, fireworks, popular music, wearing special or new clothes, eating empanadas and the giving of parties of various kinds. With each stroke of the clock until midnight, the families eat grapes. It is a common practice to consume a variety of tropical foodstuffs, including melon, sandia, or watermelon and chontaduro.

Ecuador
A New Year's Eve tradition in Ecuador is for men to dress in drag, representing the "widows" of the past year. They dance in the streets and ask for a toll from drivers to pass.

There are also traditional family events, meals, and modern celebrations such as hosting parties and going to nightclubs. Ecuadorians usually eat grapes and drink Champagne with close family members and friends.

Suriname
In Suriname, Surinamese Citizens goes into cities' commercial districts to watch fireworks shows on New Year's Eve. It is a spectacle based on the famous red-firecracker-ribbons. The bigger stores invest in these firecrackers and display them in the streets. Every year the length of them is compared, and high praises are held for the company that has managed to import the largest ribbon. These celebrations start at 10am and finish the next day. The day is usually filled with laughter, dance, music, and drinking. When the night starts, the big street parties are already at full capacity. The most popular fiesta is the one that is held at café 't Vat in the main tourist district. The parties stop between 10 and 11pm after which the people go home to light their pagaras (red-firecracker-ribbons) at midnight. After midnight, the parties continue and the streets fill again until daybreak.

Uruguay
In Uruguay, traditional celebrations include family gatherings in which asado and lechon are usually eaten, as well as turrón and pan dulce as desserts.

In the Old City of Montevideo, a district where a large number of office buildings are concentrated, employees, prior to the end of the last working day of the year, throw torn daybooks and calendars through the windows, causing a “paper rain”, which adds to the buckets of water that are thrown from the balconies. In the Mercado del Puerto there is a massive “cider fight” accompanied by music. At the stroke of midnight, Uruguayans flock to the streets to enjoy fireworks and light firecrackers, and to eat Twelve Grapes.

Due to the fact that Uruguay lies in the Southern Hemisphere, the New Year is celebrated in summer, so resort cities such as Punta del Este are filled with Uruguayans and foreign tourists, including celebrities from the region, to attend parties and festivals of music, fireworks, and light shows on the beach.

Venezuela
Radio specials give a countdown and announce the New Year. In Caracas, the bells of the Cathedral of Caracas ring twelve times. During these special programs, is a tradition to broadcast songs about the end of the year. It is a non-working holiday. Popular songs include "Viejo año" ("Old year"), by Gaita group Maracaibo 15, and "Cinco pa' las 12" ("Five minutes before twelve"), which was versioned by several popular singers including Nestor Zavarce, Nancy Ramos and José Luis Rodríguez El Puma. The unofficial hymn for the first minutes of the New Year is "Año Nuevo, Vida Nueva" ("New Year, New Life"), by the band Billo's Caracas Boys. Venezuelans play the national anthem in their houses.

Traditions include wearing yellow underwear, eating Pan de jamón, and 12 grapes with sparkling wine.

Special holiday programs are broadcast on Venezuelan television stations including Venevision.

Religious observances
Many Christian congregations have New Year's Eve watchnight services. Many denominations in Christianity, especially Moravians and Methodists, as well as congregations populated by certain ethnic communities, such as in the Korean community and African American community, have a tradition known as the Watch Night service (or Watch Night Mass), in which the faithful congregate in services continuing past midnight, giving thanks for the blessings of the outgoing year and praying for divine favor during the upcoming year. In the English-speaking world, Watch Night services can be traced back to John Wesley, the founder of Methodism, who learned the custom from the Moravian Brethren who came to England in the 1730s. Moravian congregations still observe the Watch Night service on New Year's Eve. Watch Night services took on special significance to African Americans on New Year's Eve 1862, as slaves anticipated the arrival of 1 January 1863, when the Emancipation Proclamation became effective.

With Christianity, in the Roman Catholic Church, Lutheran Churches, and the Anglican Communion, 1 January is observed as the Feast of the Circumcision of Christ, and specifically within Roman Catholicism, honouring the Blessed Virgin Mary, the Mother of Jesus; it is a Holy Day of Obligation in most countries (Australia being a notable exception), thus the Church requires the attendance of all Catholics in such countries for Mass that day. However a vigil Mass may be held on the evening before a Holy Day; thus it has become customary to also have Mass on the night of New Year's Eve (which are sometimes referred to as Watchnight Masses). (New Year's Eve is a feast day honoring Pope Sylvester I in the Roman Catholic calendar, but it is not widely recognized in the United States). The Catholic Church grants a plenary indulgence, under the usual conditions, to those who recite the Te Deum in public on New Year's Eve, which is usually done prior to the celebration of Mass.

In Vatican City, on December 31, the Pope usually performs a solemn service of Vespers with recitation of the Te Deum in St. Peter's Basilica. After the service, he usually goes out from the basilica into St. Peter's Square to greet the faithful and visit the Nativity scene on the square.

Music

Music associated with New Year's Eve comes in both classical and popular genres, and there is also Christmas song focus on the arrival of a new year during the Christmas and holiday season.
"Auld Lang Syne" by Robert Burns.
Johann Sebastian Bach, in the Orgelbüchlein, composed three chorale preludes for the new year: Helft mir Gotts Güte preisen ["Help me to praise God's goodness"] (BWV 613); Das alte Jahr vergangen ist ["The old year has passed"] (BWV 614); and In dir ist freude ["In you is joy"] (BWV 615).
"The year is gone, beyond recall" is a traditional Christian hymn to give thanks for the new year, dating back to 1713.
"Happy New Year" by ABBA
"Imagine" by John Lennon
"It Was a Very Good Year" by Frank Sinatra
"It's Just Another New Year's Eve" by Barry Manilow
"Let's Start the New Year Right" by Bing Crosby
"Celebration" by Kool & the Gang
"New Year's Day" by U2
"The Final Countdown" by Europe
"Ding Dong Ding Dong" by George Harrison
"Que Sera, Sera (Whatever Will Be, Will Be)" by Doris Day
"Ode to Joy" from the 9th Symphony of Ludwig van Beethoven
"Same Old Lang Syne" by Dan Fogelberg
"Let's Spend This New Year's Eve At Home" by Christi Bauerlee
"Good Riddance (Time of Your Life)" by Green Day
"Kiss Me at Midnight" by 'N Sync from their 1998 album The Winter Album
"Firework" by Katy Perry
"This Is the New Year" by A Great Big World
"New Year's Day" by Taylor Swift
"1999" by Prince
"Will 2K" by Will Smith
"Millennium" by Robbie Williams
"Brand New Day" by Sting
"Disco 2000" by Pulp
"Año Más" by Mecano
"Xīnnián Hǎo" (新年好), a Mandarin version of the popular American folk song Oh My Darling, Clementine

See also

New Year's food
List of films set around New Year
List of objects dropped on New Year's Eve

References
143.Google Doodle celebrates New Year's EVE 2021 Events . article from ST NEWS

December observances
Holidays
New Year celebrations
Fireworks events
Annual events
December events
Articles containing video clips